Parmelia omphalodes is a species of foliose lichen in the family Parmeliaceae. It is one of the several dozen lichen species first described in 1753 by Carl Linnaeus. Swedish lichenologist Erik Acharius transferred it to the genus Parmelia in 1803. The lichen is widely distributed, having been recorded in Asia, Africa, Europe, and North and South Americas. Morphologically similar–but genetically distinct–species include Parmelia discordans and P. pinnatifida.

References

omphalodes
Lichen species
Lichens described in 1753
Taxa named by Carl Linnaeus
Lichens of Asia
Lichens of Africa
Lichens of Europe
Lichens of North America
Lichens of South America